The following is a list of 1990 Seattle Mariners draft picks. The Mariners took part in the June regular draft, also known as the Rule 4 draft. The Mariners made 75 selections in the 1990 draft, the first being first baseman Marc Newfield in the first round. In all, the Mariners selected 34 pitchers, 12 outfielders, 10 shortstops, 6 catchers, 6 first basemen, 4 third basemen, and 3 second basemen.

Draft

Key

Table

References
General references

Inline citations

External links
Seattle Mariners official website